Wyvill is a surname and may refer to:

Sir Christopher Wyvill, 3rd Baronet (1614–1681), English politician 
Christopher Wyvill (1740–1822), English political reformer
Marmaduke Wyvill (disambiguation)
Shaun Wyvill, Irish rugby league player
Wyvill baronets

See also 
Wyville, a village in Lincolnshire, England